The Interstate Highways in New Hampshire comprise three current primary Interstate Highways and two auxiliary Interstates. In addition, one auxiliary Interstate number has been decommissioned along with a lone business Interstate.


List

See also

References

External links

 
Interstate